Voyage to Venus may refer to:

 Voyage to Venus (Doctor Who audio)
 A later title for Perelandra by C. S. Lewis
 One of a list of Dan Dare stories